Zephaniah B. Rawson (June 5, 1858 – June 29, 1928) was an American politician and lawyer in the state of Washington. He served in the Washington House of Representatives.

References

Republican Party members of the Washington House of Representatives
1858 births
1928 deaths
People from Paris, Maine